Encrasima is a genus of moths in the family Autostichidae.

Species
Encrasima elaeopis Meyrick, 1916 (Sri Lanka)
Encrasima insularis (Butler, 1880) (Madagascar)
Encrasima simpliciella (Stainton, 1859) (from India)
Encrasima retractella (Walker, 1864) (from China)
Encrasima reversa Meyrick, 1916 (Sri Lanka)
Encrasima xanthoclista Meyrick, 1923 (Sri Lanka)

References

ftp.funet.fi

 
Autostichinae